The 2007 North Dakota State Bison football team represented North Dakota State University in the 2007 NCAA Division I FCS football season. The team was led by fifth-year head coach Craig Bohl and played their homes games at the Fargodome in Fargo, North Dakota.  The Bison finished with an overall record of 10–1, placing second in the Great West Conference with a 3–1 mark. North Dakota State averaged 40 points per game and allowing just 22 points per game to opponents. The Bison totaled 4,855 total yards of offense, an average of 441 yards per game.

Despite being ranked in the top five in both polls the entire year, North Dakota State was ineligible to make the playoffs per NCAA rules that mandated a four-year probationary period for football programs entering the NCAA Division I Football Championship Subdivision.   During their first four years after moving to Division I (2004–2007), North Dakota State had a record of 35–9 (.795) and were ranked in the top-25 32 of 44 weeks.

Schedule

References

North Dakota State
North Dakota State Bison football seasons
North Dakota State Bison football